Paul Burns may refer to:

Paul Burns (footballer) (born 1984), Scottish footballer
Paul Burns (judge), Irish judge
Paul E. Burns (1881–1967), American actor

See Also
Pauline Powell Burns (1872–1912), American pianist and artist
Paul Byrne (disambiguation)